Mikhalevo is a rural locality (a village) in Lavrovskoye Rural Settlement, Sudogodsky District, Vladimir Oblast, Russia. The population was 20 as of 2010.

Geography 
It is located on the Sudogda River, 11 km north from Lavrovo, 14 km north from Sudogda.

References 

Rural localities in Sudogodsky District